Zabrđe is a village in the municipality of Cetinje, Montenegro. It is located just southeast of the former capital, Cetinje.

Demographics
According to the 2011 census, its population was 119.

References

Populated places in Cetinje Municipality